Péter Fröhlich of Hungary is a noted sabre coach and was British Olympic coach in 1992, 1996, 2000 and 2008. He coached many members of the Hungarian team at Under-20 and senior level in 1999 to 2001.

Fröhlich lived and worked in Truro, Cornwall, UK for an extended period leading Truro Fencing Club's performance program and coaching full-time at the club. He returned to Hungary in September 2012.

Hungarian male sabre fencers
Living people
Year of birth missing (living people)
Place of birth missing (living people)
Fencing coaches
Hungarian expatriate sportspeople in England